In Riemannian geometry the Schouten tensor is a second-order tensor introduced by Jan Arnoldus Schouten defined for  by:

where Ric is the Ricci tensor (defined by contracting the first and third indices of the Riemann tensor), R is the scalar curvature, g is the Riemannian metric,  is the trace of P and n is the dimension of the manifold.

The Weyl tensor equals the Riemann curvature tensor minus the Kulkarni–Nomizu product of the Schouten tensor with the metric. In an index notation

The Schouten tensor often appears in conformal geometry because of its relatively simple conformal transformation law

where

Further reading
Arthur L. Besse, Einstein Manifolds. Springer-Verlag, 2007. See Ch.1 §J "Conformal Changes of Riemannian Metrics."
Spyros Alexakis, The Decomposition of Global Conformal Invariants. Princeton University Press, 2012. Ch.2, noting in a footnote that the Schouten tensor is a "trace-adjusted Ricci tensor" and may be considered as "essentially the Ricci tensor."
Wolfgang Kuhnel and Hans-Bert Rademacher, "Conformal diffeomorphisms preserving the Ricci tensor", Proc. Amer. Math. Soc. 123 (1995), no. 9, 2841–2848. Online eprint (pdf).
T. Bailey, M.G. Eastwood and A.R. Gover, "Thomas's Structure Bundle for Conformal, Projective and Related Structures", Rocky Mountain Journal of Mathematics, vol. 24, Number 4, 1191-1217.

See also
Weyl–Schouten theorem
Cotton tensor

Riemannian geometry
Tensors
Tensors in general relativity